Notes on Afghánistan and Part of Balúchistán: Geographical, Ethnographical ... is a book by Major Henry George Raverty. The work was published in four installments between 1881 and 1888. The first Pakistani edition was published in 1978.

The book is an account and history of the tribal areas in the North-West Frontier Province of Pakistan and in Balochistan, Afghanistan.

References

External links 
Notes on Afghánistan and Part of Balúchistán at Internet Archive

1881 non-fiction books
1978 non-fiction books
19th-century history books
20th-century history books
History books about Pakistan
History books about Afghanistan
History books about ethnic groups
Balochistan